In mathematics a positive map is a map between C*-algebras that sends positive elements to positive elements. A completely positive map is one which satisfies a stronger, more robust condition.

Definition 

Let  and  be C*-algebras. A linear map  is called positive map if  maps positive elements to positive elements: .

Any linear map  induces another map

in a natural way.

Properties 

 Positive maps are monotone, i.e.  for all self-adjoint elements .
 Since  for all self-adjoint elements , every positive map is automatically continuous with respect to the C*-norms and its operator norm equals . A similar statement with approximate units holds for non-unital algebras.

Examples 

 Every *-homomorphism is completely positive.
 For every linear operator  between Hilbert spaces, the map  is completely positive. Stinespring's theorem says that all completely positive maps are compositions of *-homomorphisms and these special maps.
 Every positive functional  (in particular every state) is automatically completely positive.
 Every positive map  is completely positive.
 The transposition of matrices is a standard example of a positive map that fails to be 2-positive. Moreover, the eigenvalues of this matrix are 1,1,1 and −1. (This matrix happens to be the Choi matrix of T, in fact.) Incidentally, a map Φ is said to be co-positive if the composition Φ  T is positive. The transposition map itself is a co-positive map.

See also
 Choi's theorem on completely positive maps

C*-algebras